This is a list of provinces of Costa Rica by Human Development Index as of 2023 with data for the year 2021.

References 

Costa Rica
Costa Rica
Economy of Costa Rica